Bennie Leo Aldridge (October 24, 1926May 14, 1956) was an American football defensive back and a halfback in the National Football League who played for the New York Yanks, the Dallas Texans, the San Francisco 49ers and the Green Bay Packers.  Aldridge played his college football at Oklahoma State University and played 43 professional games from 1950–1953.

References

1926 births
1956 deaths
People from Duncan, Oklahoma
Players of American football from Oklahoma
American football defensive backs
American football halfbacks
Oklahoma State Cowboys football players
New York Yanks players
Dallas Texans (NFL) players
Green Bay Packers players
San Francisco 49ers players